In some militaries, foot guards are senior infantry regiments. Foot guards are commonly responsible for guarding royal families or other state leaders, and they also often perform ceremonial duties accordingly, but at the same time are combat soldiers.

Foot Guards by country

Canada

Two regiments of foot guards exist in the Canadian Army's Primary Reserve, the Governor General's Foot Guards (GGFG) and the Canadian Grenadier Guards (CGG). The two foot guards, along with the Governor General's Horse Guards, form Canada's Household Division. Although the GGFG has its buttons in pairs, compared to the single buttons of the CGG, it is the more senior regiment. The paired buttons on the GGFG's scarlet tunic is a result of its historical alliance to the British Coldstream Guards, whose tunics are styled similarly.

The Canadian Guards was another regiment of foot guards from the Canadian Army's Regular Force, although it was reduced to nil strength and placed on the Supplementary Order of Battle in 1970. Its colours are deposited at Rideau Hall should it be desired to stand up the regiment again.

The Royal Regiment of Canada, despite being a line infantry regiment, wears foot guards full-dress uniform. This is in token of the alliance its predecessor The Royal Grenadiers had with the Grenadier Guards. The full-dress uniform has a scarlet-over-white plume, and buttons are worn singly in like manner.

Denmark
The foot guards of Denmark consists of the Royal Life Guards (Den Kongelige Livgarde). It is primarily a mechanized infantry regiment in the Danish Army, with the Guard Company of the regiment performing guard/ceremonial public duties for the Danish monarchy. They provide a permanent guard at the Amalienborg Palace, as well as mount at guard at Fredensborg Palace, Marselisborg Palace, Gråsten Palace, and Christiansborg Palace on occasion.

The regiment is currently composed of 4 active duty units:

  1st Battalion 
  2nd Battalion 
  Guard Company 
  Royal Life Guard Music Band

Finland

The Guard Jaeger Regiment (Finnish: Kaartin Jääkärirykmentti, Swedish: Gardesjägarregementet) is a Finnish Army unit located in Santahamina, an island district of Helsinki. The regiment trains Guard jaegers for fighting in an urban environment. The Military Police Company of the Guard Jaeger Regiment provides the ceremonial guard of honour for the President of Finland.

France
The first infantry regiment of the Republican Guard is responsible for protecting the President of France and for ceremonial duties. Other historical French foot guard regiments include:
 Garde du Corps (1419–1791; 1815–1830)
 Gardes Françaises (1563–1789)
 Swiss Guards (1616–1792)
 Imperial Guard (1804–1815)
 Old Guard
 Middle Guard
 Young Guard
 Imperial Guard Corps (1854–1870)

Germany

The Wachbataillon perform ceremonial guard duty for various branches of the German government. It is currently the largest battalion in the Bundeswehr, having up to 1,000 soldiers based in Berlin. 
The battalion follows the tradition of the 1. Foot Guard Regiment (1. Garde-Rgt. z.F.).

Italy

The foot guards functions in the Italian Army are held by the Granatieri di Sardegna Brigade, direct heir of the original Guards' Regiment founded on April 18, 1659. The brigade's two regiments of guards infantry have a highly distinguished combat history and are still employed both in ceremonial and combat roles.

The Carabinieri (the militarised gendarmerie-type law enforcement agency of Italy) also fields a ceremonial guards unit – the Reggimento Corazzieri ("Cuirassiers Regiment"), based in Rome, which carries its ceremonial role both on foot and on horseback at the Quirinal Palace – the official residence of the President of Italy. It is more compatible to a dragoons regiment while being more of a cuirassier unit due to its uniform.

Russia
Russia's Presidential Regiment (also known as the Kremlin Regiment), although not a part of the Russian Armed Forces but part of the Russian Federal Protective Service, which directly reports to the President of Russia, is the elite unit that provides the guard of honor at the Tomb of the Unknown Soldier at Moscow's Alexander Garden and is tasked with the protection of the President, his family and the Kremlin complex. When in the Kremlin itself (at Cathedral Square) or at Red Square, during important occasions and weekends, it maintains certain traditions of the Russian Imperial Guard through its uniforms and rifle and cavalry drills during the weekly Changing of the Guard ceremony together with the regimental band, Infantry units and the Cavalry Escort Squadron. The regiment, since the mid-2010s, has also provided sentries at the Spasskaya Tower entrance facing Red Square. In the future, the regiment will be reinforced by the Semyonovsky Regiment (reestablished in 2013), which falls under the Armed Forces and is currently the sole independent regiment of infantry in the Russian Ground Forces. The 154th Preobrazhensky Independent Commandant's Regiment, being a part of the Armed Forces, thus only performs honor guard duties only during state visits to Russia, wreath laying ceremonies at the Tomb of the Unknown Soldier, and the major parades in Moscow (May 9 and November 7, respectively), as well as in major anniversary parades all over Russia if needed.

Spain

Spain's  is one of the oldest bodyguard units in the world. On top of protecting the king and deploying overseas, they also perform ceremonial duties. The regiment primarily provide protection to members of Spanish royal family, as well as royal households such as the Royal Palace of Madrid, the Palace of El Pardo and the Palace of Zarzuela. Its organizational structure is based around five battalion-sized units including the High Command Group, Escorts Group, Honors Group, Logistics Group, and the Musical Unit of the Spanish Royal Guard

The Royal Guard Honors Group is the principal foot guards unit of the Armed Forces, which provides ceremonial and actual security to the royal family. Permanently garrisoned in Madrid, the capital city, the battalion-sized formation is organized into:

Group HQ
Army Company ""
1st Platoon
2nd Platoon
3rd Platoon
Drill Team Platoon
Navy and Marine Composite Company ""
1st Platoon
2nd Platoon
3rd Platoon
Air Force Squadron ""
1st Flight
2nd Flight
3rd Flight
 Mountaineering Group
 Royal Guard Diving Unit

The other foot guards regiment of the armed forces is the Spanish Army's Infantry Regiment "Inmemorial del Rey" No. 1 stationed in the Army Headquarters, Buenavista Palace, Madrid. It is one of the oldest standing guards units in the world, raised by King Ferdinand III of Castile in 1248. Traditionally, as the regiment is linked to the Spanish royal family and to the sovereign in his/her duty as Captain General and Commander-in-Chief of the Armed Forces, all the princes of Asturias since 1862 are enrolled as honorary soldiers in the 1st Guards Company.  The duty of Foot Guards is the responsibility of the Honor Guard Battalion "Old Guard of Castille", which is part of the regiment and organized into:

 Battalion HQ
 1st Guards Company
 2nd Guards Company
 Artillery Honors Section
 Battalion Corps of Drums 
 Drum and Bugle Section
 Fife and Drum section

Sweden

The Royal Guards is responsible for protection of the Swedish Royal Family. They are made up of the Life Guards. The Royal Guard has been responsible for providing security to Stockholm Palace since 1523. It is the primary honour guard detail for the king as well as an emergency unit for the capital. The guard is split up into two sections, the guard  at Stockholm Palace, and a smaller detachment stationed at Drottningholm Palace. The Royal Guards are most visible at state arrival ceremonies for visiting heads of state visiting Sweden, where it mounts the guard of honour. It performs the changing of the guard ceremony at the Outer Courtyard of the palace, drawing approximately 800,000 tourists per year. The foot guards component is made up of three foot guards companies that fall under the King's Guards Battalion, all performing public duties alongside their combat and security roles. In addition, the 12th Motorized Infantry Battalion (raised 2016) is also designated foot guards, but only performs combat operations.

Ukraine
The Hetman Bohdan Khmelnytsky Independent Presidential Brigade a special military unit of Ukrainian Armed Forces which is mandated to defend the President of Ukraine in his duty as Supreme Commander of the Armed Forces, the First Family, and the presidential residences and facilities assigned to the presidential office. With its Honor Guard Battalion providing ceremonial guard duty for official events.

United Kingdom

The Foot Guards are the Regular Infantry regiments of the Household Division of the British Army. There have been six active regiments of foot guards and one reserve regiment, five of which still exist. The Royal Guards Reserve Regiment was a reserve formation of the Household Brigade in existence from 1900 to 1901. The Machine Gun Guards, which was formed during the First World War, was disbanded in 1920. 

Grenadier Guards
Coldstream Guards
Scots Guards
Irish Guards
Welsh Guards
London Guards (reserve)
Guards Machine Gun Regiment (disbanded)
Royal Guards Reserve Regiment (disbanded)

While these regiments have other distinguishing features, a simple method of distinguishing members of the different Guards units by their appearance is by the spacing of buttons on the tunic.  The ascending number of buttons also indicates the order in which the regiments were formed, although the 1st Regiment of Foot Guards, an ancestor of the Grenadier Guards, is younger than the regiment that now takes the name of the Coldstream Guards; the oldest continuously serving regiment in the regular British Army (there are older regiments in the Army Reserve). There are various other distinguishing features of the uniforms of the regiments, such as the colour of the plume, which side it is worn on the bearskin, the collar badge and the shoulder badge. When all five regiments parade together, they are in the order of Grenadier Guards on the right flank, then Scots Guards, Welsh Guards, Irish Guards and Coldstream Guards on the left flank. This is because although the Coldstream are ranked second in seniority, their motto is "Nulli Secundus" ('Second to None').

The five regiments of Foot Guards, lined up as they parade:

Units of the Foot Guards

Grenadier Guards
1st Battalion, Grenadier Guards
Nijmegen Company, Grenadier Guards
Ypres Company, Grenadier Guards, Kingston upon Thames
Coldstream Guards
1st Battalion, Coldstream Guards
No 7 Company, Coldstream Guards
No 17 Company, Coldstream Guards, Hammersmith
Scots Guards
1st Battalion, Scots Guards
F Company, Scots Guards
G (Messines) Company, Scots Guards, Westminster 
Irish Guards
1st Battalion, Irish Guards
 No 12 Company, Irish Guards
No 15 (Loos) Company, Irish Guards, Camberwell
Welsh Guards
1st Battalion, Welsh Guards

The first four regiments each have a separate incremental company, which keep custody of the colours and traditions of the currently dormant 2nd Battalions. These companies perform ceremonial and security duties in London.

Two battalions are appointed for public duties, with a third from a line infantry regiment since 1996 (and occasionally previous to that year). These provide the King's Guard, the Tower of London Guard, and sometimes also the Windsor Castle Guard. The Guards Battalions on Public Duties are located in barracks close to Buckingham Palace for them to be able to reach the Palace very quickly in an emergency. In central London, a battalion is based at Wellington Barracks, Westminster, about 300 yards from Buckingham Palace. However, as of 2010, the independent incremental companies of the Grenadier and Coldstream Guards (all on permanent public duties) have been moved from Chelsea Barracks to the Royal Artillery Barracks in Woolwich. While F Company, Scots Guards, are now permanently based at Wellington Barracks alongside the resident infantry battalion.  The Guards Battalion stationed at Windsor generally provides the Windsor Castle Guard. The Windsor battalion is at Victoria Barracks, a quarter of a mile south of the Castle.

The Guards Division received a new battalion following the restructuring of the army in 2004, when the London Regiment became the first Territorial Army unit in this division. The regiment was subsequently disbanded, and its personnel moved to reserve companies of the four senior foot guards regiments.

The Royal Guards Reserve Regiment was in existence during the Second Boer War from 1900 to 1901.  The Guards Machine Gun Regiment was raised for service during the First World War. Initially, each brigade of the Guards Division had a machine gun company attached. In 1917, these companies were regimented to form a battalion. Further battalions (the 1st, 2nd, and 3rd Battalions) were formed by conversion of the Household Cavalry regiments. King George V ordered that the regiment be classified as the Sixth Regiment of Foot Guards, or Machine Gun Guards. However, it was disbanded in 1920.  

They initially enlisted for seven years with the colours and a further five years with the reserve or four years and eight years. They trained at the Guards' Depot in Caterham, Surrey.

United States
The United States has ceremonial units for each of the five Armed Forces. They form honor guards for the President, foreign heads of state, and other military and civilian dignitaries. They form the core military element of state-level ceremonies including the Inauguration of the President and state funerals. The 3rd U.S. Infantry Regiment, also known as "The Old Guard", is the Army's escort/ceremonial guard to the President, and their units include the Tomb Guards for the Tomb of the Unknowns at Arlington national cemetery.

The State Defense Force of Connecticut has two companies of the Governor's Foot Guard, a part-time unit that provides ceremonial functions. It consists of four different units of an organized militia in the Connecticut State Militia, two of which are foot guards and the other two being horse guard units. 

The Royal Guards of Hawaii is a ceremonial foot guard unit of the Hawaii Air National Guard which acts as the honour guard for the Governor of Hawaii. It re-enacts 19th century royal bodyguards of King Kalakaua in the Kingdom of Hawaii. Their uniform includes a pith Helmet, and white dress pants. When on parade, the 50-member royal guard carries the Springfield 45-70 rifle.

Other nations
Many other nations have regiments of foot guards in their armies, as the term 'guards' is an honorific to distinguish elite soldiers. Most monarchies have at least one regiment of guards, part of whose duties is to guard the Royal Family.
The same goes for most republics; for instance:
 the Počasno-zaštitna bojna (Honor Guard Battalion), the elite ceremonial unit of Croatian Armed Forces.
 the Presidential Guard, formerly known as Palace and then Royal Guard, is the guard unit for the President of Greece and provide an honor guard at the Tomb of the Unknown Soldier.
 The Presidential Security Group of the Armed Forces of the Philippines, the Philippine National Police, the Philippine Coast Guard and the Bureau of Fire Protection is the combined escort and security brigade for the President of the Philippines and wear on ceremony and parade the rayadillo uniforms of the Philippine Army during the Philippine Revolution, adapted for the unit due to its importance, with the dress being dark blue instead of light blue. This unique formation is the only one of its kind, with its members coming from the armed and police services, the coast guard and the fire services.
 Brazil has the Presidential Guard Battalion in Brasília, as the primary foot guards unit of the Brazilian Army, tasked with the protection of the President of Brazil and his residence, the National Congress of Brazil, and all other government buildings in the Brazilian Federal District. It has the lineage of the Imperial Guards Battalion formed by Emperor Dom Pedro I in 1822 and as such wears its uniform in all ceremonies. 
 Brazil also has the 1st Foot Guards Battalion within the Eastern Military Command, and Foot Guards companies in the other military regions within the Brazilian Army. Their role is the defense of military installations and to reinforce the Army Police during contingencies and major events.
 The 37th Infantry Presidential Guard Battalion is the primary guards unit of the National Army of Colombia and as such is the unit mandated for the security of the President of Colombia, the House of Narino, the presidential palace, and all other important government buildings in Bogota, the capital city.
 The Presidential Honor Guard is Venezuela's guard unit, but its sports a cavalry styled uniform, as the Brigade carries the traditions of Simon Bolivar's Hussar Guards Troop, part of a larger guard formation raised in the midst of the Venezuelan War of Independence in 1815. As it reports directly to the President of Venezuela, and to the Ministry of Defense, it is a separate service branch of the National Bolivarian Armed Forces of Venezuela.
 Bolivia's guard unit is the Bolivian Colorados Regiment of the Bolivian Army.
 In Poland, honor guards duties are performed by the 1st Guards Battalion, Representative Honor Guard Regiment of the Polish Armed Forces in the Tomb of the Unknown Soldier and during state visits at the Presidential Palace, Warsaw.
 The President's Own Guard Regiment (POGR) is foot guard regiment in the Ghana Army which serves as a light infantry unit and a Guard of honour for the President of Ghana.
 The President's Guard of the Sri Lanka Army served as a foot guard unit until 2015.

Other countries that have Guards Units
 Russia and Belarus, as well as the former Soviet Union republics in the Caucasus, Central Asia and the Baltic (except Lithuania) have Guards units in their own respective armed forces units. A historical extension of the Russian Imperial Guard, these Guards units represent the elite troops of these nations and in the Russian and Belorussian units, remind everyone of these units' contribution to the Second World War and the war's Allied victory in the eastern parts of Europe and eastern Asia.
 Romania's guard unit is the 30th Guards Brigade "Michael the Brave" of the Romanian Land Forces Logistics Command.
 Bulgaria's guard formation is the National Guard Unit. According to the country's Armed Forces Law it forms an integral part of the Armed Forces of Bulgaria, but is outside Defence Staff subordination and falls under the direct authority of the Ministry of Defense. It is a regimental equivalent, but with units at reduced strength. The National Guards Unit is based in the capital Sofia, numbers up to 1 000 officers, NCOs, guardsmen and civilian staff and has its own band. The National Guard Unit's sole function is purely ceremonial and according to the Constitution of Bulgaria it is a symbol of the Bulgarian State, next to the national flag, coat of arms and the national anthem. Throughout most of the time of its existence during the monarchy the Bulgarian Guard has been a cavalry unit, which is the reason why today's infantry ceremonial unit sports a cavalry style uniform, but nowadays, like cavalry dragoons of the past, carry only rifles (SKS, the color guard included) while only the officers carry sabres.
 The Guard's Brigade is the security unit is the Nigerian Army.
 Serbia has the Serbian Guards Unit headquartered in Belgrade and serves as the guards unit of the Serbian Armed Forces. Being a full-time regiment it serves as the honor guard to the President of Serbia and comes under the command of the Serbian General Staff.
 Turkey has the Presidential Guard Regiment stationed in Çankaya Köşkü, the official residence of the President of the Republic of Turkey. Unlike the rest of Turkish Armed Forces, especially the Turkish Land Forces, they wear Blue-White Ceremonial Dress Uniforms full-time and serve as an honorific unit to the President of Turkey, with TLF personnel forming the majority of serving personnel.
 The National Ceremonial Guard in South Africa performs honor guard duties as part of the South African National Defence Force to the President of South Africa.
 The Brigade of the Guards is the Indian Army's foot guards regiment, formed through the regimentation of battalions from four of India's senior line infantry regiments. The President's Bodyguard is responsible for the security of the President of India. 
 The Garderegiment Grenadiers en Jagers & Garderegiment Fuseliers Prinses Irene are the two foot guard regiments in the Netherlands.
 The foot guards of Norway consists of the Hans Majestet Kongens Garde (lit., His Majesty The King's Guard; the Royal Guards).

Guards Bands
The unit military bands of these guards hold senior positions within the armed forces of their home country. These bands, often internationally known informally as Guards Bands have included the following:

The Guards Brass Band (Bulgaria)
Kaartin Soittokunta (Finland)
Band of the Guards Brigade (Nigeria)
Band of the Brigade of The Guards Training Centre (India)
Bands of the Household Division (UK)

See also

 Guard Mounting
 Household Cavalry (Horse Guards)
 King's Guard
 Household Division

Footnotes

External links

British and Commonwealth
 Grenadier Guards
 Coldstream Guards
 Scots Guards
 Irish Guards
 Welsh Guards
 Governor General's Foot Guards
 The Canadian Grenadier Guards
 Federation Guard
 Brigade of the Guards

Other nations
 Den Kongelige Livgarde
 Högvakten
 Hans Majestet Kongens Garde
 and  – Governor's Guards

Guards regiments
Infantry